Kevin Kopelson is an American literary critic. He received a B.A. from Yale University, a J.D. from Columbia University, and a Ph.D. from Brown University. Currently, he is Emeritus Professor of English at The University of Iowa.

He is a contributor to the London Review of Books. He writes on topics ranging from fin-de-siècle literature to fashion photography.

Fields
Kopelson has published in the fields of sexuality studies, critical theory, cultural studies, and 20th-century literature.

Works 
 Love's Litany: The Writing of Modern Homoerotics (Stanford University Press, 1994).
 Beethoven's Kiss: Pianism, Perversion, and the Mastery of Desire (Stanford University Press, 1996).
 The Queer Afterlife of Vaslav Nijinsky (Stanford University Press, 1997).
 Finishing Proust (2000)
 Neatness Counts: Essays on the Writer's Desk (University of Minnesota Press, 2004).
 Sedaris (University of Minnesota Press, 2007).
 Confessions of a Plagiarist: And Other Tales from School (Counterpath Press, 2012).
 Adorno and the Showgirl: Or Late Style (2016)

References

External links
 Personal website
 Professional website

University of Iowa faculty
Living people
Yale University alumni
Columbia Law School alumni
Brown University alumni
Year of birth missing (living people)